Albert 'Toks' van der Linde  (born 30 December 1969) is a former South African rugby union player.

Playing career
Van der Linde went to school in Senekal in the Free State and represented  at the annual Craven Week tournament in 1986 and 1987.

In 1996 he toured with the Springboks to Argentina, France and Wales and played in four of the five test matches, each time as a replacement. His next and final test match was five years later against  in Paris. He also played in eleven tour matches, scoring two tries for the Springboks.

Test history

Later career
After retiring, van der Linde worked as rugby commentator and television show host. In 2011 he, together with Breyton Paulse and Janina Oberholzer, became presenters of Toks & Tjops, an informal chat show, on the  South African  Afrikaans-language television channel, kykNET where sporting events are discussed.

See also
List of South Africa national rugby union players – Springbok no. 629

References

1969 births
Living people
South African rugby union players
South Africa international rugby union players
Free State Cheetahs players
Sharks (Currie Cup) players
Western Province (rugby union) players
Stormers players
People from Setsoto Local Municipality
Rugby union players from the Free State (province)
Rugby union props